Our Lady of Good Counsel High School is a private, Catholic, college-preparatory, coeducational high school in Olney, Maryland, an unincorporated area of Montgomery County, Maryland. It is located in the Roman Catholic Archdiocese of Washington.

Operated under the sponsorship of the Xaverian Brothers, Our Lady of Good Counsel serves students grades nine through twelve.

The school was founded in 1958 as an all-boys school in Wheaton, Maryland.

The faculty consists of 200 teachers, counselors and administrators. 70 percent of the teachers hold advanced degrees. In September 1993 and 2002, Good Counsel High School was awarded the Blue Ribbon Award for Excellence in Secondary Education by the United States Department of Education. The school is fully accredited by the Middle States Association.

On July 1, 2011, Paul Barker took the helm as president after former Xaverian brother, Art Raimo, moved on from his position after serving 15 years as the president and another 18 years as a teacher/staff member at Good Counsel. Alumnus Tom Campbell '93, became principal on July 1, 2013, following the retirement of Jack Graham.

Academics
Good Counsel High School offers both Advanced Placement courses, the STEM Program, and the International Baccalaureate Program.  The school offers classes in three tracks: Honors, College Prep, or Ryken. The Ryken Program is geared towards students with mild learning differences and is named after Theodore Ryken, founder of the Xaverian Brothers

Religious life
As a Xaverian Brothers sponsored school, Good Counsel has an active campus ministry. Students are required to take four years of religious studies classes, as well as participate in religious retreats. The school chaplain offers a daily Mass as well as all-school Masses on major religious holidays. Students and faculty participate as altar servers, readers, Eucharistic ministers, and choir members. All students are required to complete a certain number of community service hours each year, for a total of 80 hours upon graduation.

Fine arts
All Good Counsel students are required to fulfill at least one art credit before graduation. The school offers Theatre, Band, Chorus, Dance, and Visual Arts. Good Counsel's visual arts program begins with the Art Fundamentals course and includes courses that focus on drawing, sculpting, and artwork in other mediums. The school has musical ensembles including a wind ensemble, symphonic band, string ensemble, beginning and advanced percussion ensembles, jazz ensemble, and a marching band. The school's theater program performs two mainstage productions a year. A 700-seat performing arts center opened in the spring of 2016. Every year, for the past several years, Good Counsel's Theatre productions have received a five-star rating from the DC Metro Theatre Arts Magazine, including their presentation of Les Misérables.

Athletics
Good Counsel has many of the area's top-ranked athletic teams and is recognized as a regional and national powerhouse for both boys' and girls' sports. GC has collected over 60 championship titles in the past decade. Many of their talented student-athletes have continued at the collegiate level and have received athletic scholarships at notable colleges and universities.

Good Counsel has most recently won, or has been a finalist for, the WCAC championship title in the following sports:

 Football 
 Girls' Lacrosse
 Boys' Cross Country 
 Girls' Soccer
 Wrestling 
 Swimming
 Girls' Field Hockey
 Boys' Track 
 Girls' Basketball
 Girls' Volleyball 
 Boys' Baseball
 Girls' Cheerleading
Both the men's and women's swim teams are traditionally, among the best in the Washington area. The women's team won 13 straight Metro titles from 1997-2009.

The varsity ice hockey team won the MAPHL (Mid-Atlantic Prep Hockey League) Varsity A championship game in 2013 and 2015. The team also boasts a championship in 2002-2003 in the MSHL (Maryland State Hockey League). New in 2014, is the Good Counsel Equestrian Team, which successfully competes throughout the year.

Notable alumni
Good Counsel has many notable alumni, recognizing them annually with a Distinguished Alumni award. The football team has also had many players make it to the NFL.

Rev. Robert B. Lawton, S.J., Ph.D. 1965 – President, Loyola Marymount University.
Al Checchi  1966 – former Chairman of Northwest Airlines and California gubernatorial candidate.
Marty Hurney 1974 – American football executive.
John Berry 1977 – United States Ambassador to Australia.
Kevin Blackistone 1977 – columnist, Dallas Morning News; panelist, ESPN Around The Horn.
Joseph Curl 1978 – Columnist, White House correspondent, The Washington Times. Editor, The Drudge Report. 
Mark Povinelli 1989 – actor, Water for Elephants (2011 film), Modern Family, Cold Case.
Rick Yune 1989 – actor, The Fast and the Furious and Die Another Day (James Bond villain), a graduate of Wharton School (Penn), cousin of NBA star Jeremy Lin.
Zach Hilton 1998 – former NFL player with New Orleans Saints 2003–2005 and New York Jets 2006; graduated from University of North Carolina.
Chas Gessner 1999 – professional football player, member of 2003 Super Bowl champion New England Patriots.
Roger Mason Jr. 1999 – NBA player for 7 different teams; graduated from University of Virginia; Executive Vice President of NBA Players Association.
James Gist 2004 – 2008 second-round draft pick for NBA's San Antonio Spurs; player for Greek professional basketball powerhouse Panathinaikos; graduated from University of Maryland.
Jelani Jenkins 2009 – 2013 fourth-round draft pick for NFL's Miami Dolphins, linebacker for Oakland Raiders, Buffalo Bills, and Houston Texans; graduate of University of Florida.
Lou Young 2010 – undrafted free agent signed in 2014 by NFL's Denver Broncos; defensive back for Georgia Tech, Baltimore Ravens, Jacksonville Jaguars, Carolina Panthers, Washington Redskins, and Arizona Cardinals.
Rodney Glasgow Jr. 2010 - professional basketball player for Sheffield Sharks.
Blake Countess 2011 – 2016 sixth-round pick by NFL's Philadelphia Eagles; defensive back for Los Angeles Rams, University of Michigan and Auburn University.
Stefon Diggs 2012 – WR for NFL’s Buffalo Bills; 2015 fifth-round pick by NFL's Minnesota Vikings;  WR and KR for University of Maryland; ACC Rookie-of-the-Year runner-up.
Jack Conger 2013 – Rio de Janeiro 2016 Summer Olympics 4 × 200 meter freestyle relay gold medalist; national high school record holder for the 500-yard freestyle.
Kendall Fuller 2013 – 2016 third-round pick by NFL's Washington Redskins; defensive back for Washington Commanders and Virginia Tech; ACC Defensive Rookie-of-the-Year; Super Bowl LIV Champion with NFL’s Kansas City Chiefs.
Dorian O'Daniel 2013 – 2018 third-round pick by NFL's Kansas City Chiefs; linebacker for Clemson University; winner of 2017 College Football Playoff National Championship; Super Bowl LIV Champion.
Margaret Purce 2013 – current member of senior United States women's national soccer team and Sky Blue FC of the NWSL. Drafted with the 9th pick in the 2017 NWSL College Draft by the Boston Breakers and former member of the Portland Thorns. Elected to Harvard University's Board of Overseers.
Kyle Snyder 2014 – wrestler, 2016, 2017 and 2018 NCAA heavyweight champion, 2015, 2017 world champion; Rio de Janeiro 2016 Summer Olympics 97 kg freestyle gold medalist.
Imani Dorsey  2014 – current member of senior United States women's national soccer team and Sky Blue FC of the NWSL. Drafted by Sky Blue FC with the 5th overall pick in the 2018 NWSL College Draft and later named 2018 NWSL Rookie of the Year.
Sam Mustipher 2014 - undrafted free agent signed in 2019 by NFL's Chicago Bears; center for Notre Dame.
Uche Eke 2015 - Tokyo 2020 Summer Olympics Gymnastics event participant for Nigeria.
Nicole Enabosi 2015 - professional basketball player for MBK Ružomberok.
Keandre Jones 2016 - undrafted free agent signed in 2020 by NFL's Chicago Bears; linebacker for Cincinnati Bengals.
Lindsey Pulliam 2017 - professional basketball player for Elazığ İl Özel İdarespor. Drafted by the Atlanta Dream in the third round of the 2021 WNBA Draft.
Josh Paschal 2017 - 2022 second-round pick by NFL's Detroit Lions; defensive end for The University of Kentucky; named to 2021 All-SEC football team.

External links
Official website

Notes and references

 https://www.olgchs.org/aboutgc/history.php

Olney, Maryland
Catholic secondary schools in Maryland
Schools sponsored by the Xaverian Brothers
Educational institutions established in 1958
International Baccalaureate schools in Maryland
Private high schools in Montgomery County, Maryland
1958 establishments in Maryland